Clearview is a historic home located at Falmouth, Stafford County, Virginia.  It was built about 1749 and is a two-story, five bay, frame dwelling.  It has a hipped roof, exterior end chimneys, and a distyle Tuscan order front porch.  The house measures approximately 42 feet by 26 feet, with an 18 by 26 foot wing added in 1918–1919.  The property was used by the Union army as an artillery position during the Battle of Fredericksburg in December, 1862.

It was listed on the National Register of Historic Places in 1975.  It is located in the Falmouth Historic District.

References

Houses on the National Register of Historic Places in Virginia
Houses completed in 1796
National Register of Historic Places in Stafford County, Virginia
Houses in Stafford County, Virginia
Individually listed contributing properties to historic districts on the National Register in Virginia
1796 establishments in Virginia